Dzhuneyt Yashar (born 30 December 1985) is a Bulgarian footballer of Turkish descent who plays as a midfielder for Lokomotiv Gorna Oryahovitsa.

Career
He had trained at Levski Sofia's Youth Academy as a young player.

Kaliakra
Between 2006 and 2008, Yashar played Kaliakra Kavarna for two years before he eventually joined Levski Sofia.

Levski Sofia
He made his unofficial debut for Levski on 5 July 2008 in a friendly match against Spartak Pleven. Levski won the match and the result was 5:0. However, Yashar who was brought to Levski Sofia by Velislav Vutsov, did not fit new manager Emil Velev's vision for the team. It was announced that he will be bought by OFC Sliven 2000 on 8 January 2009. However, the transfer didn't materialize, so Yashar was loaned out to his ex-team PFC Kaliakra Kavarna for six months, where he was capped 12 times and scored 4 goals.

Slavia Sofia
On 25 June 2009, it was announced that Yashar will join PFC Slavia Sofia under the coaching of his former coach Velislav Vutsov. He made his A PFG debut for the club on 10 August 2009.

Vereya
Yashar moved to Vereya in July 2014.

Maritsa Plovdiv
On 17 June 2017, Yashar joined Maritsa Plovdiv.  He left the club at the end of the 2017–18 season following the relegation to Third League.

Nesebar
In June 2018, Yashar returned to Nesebar.

References

External links

Living people
1985 births
People from Asenovgrad
Bulgarian footballers
Bulgarian people of Turkish descent
First Professional Football League (Bulgaria) players
Second Professional Football League (Bulgaria) players
FC Chernomorets Burgas players
PFC Levski Sofia players
PFC Kaliakra Kavarna players
PFC Slavia Sofia players
PFC Nesebar players
FC Vereya players
FC Maritsa Plovdiv players
FC Botev Galabovo players
FC Lokomotiv Gorna Oryahovitsa players
FC Krumovgrad players
Association football midfielders